The Vampire Huntress Legend Series (VHLS) is a twelve book series written by Leslie Esdaile Banks under the pen name L.A. Banks. The series centers around a young "twenty-something" year old woman named Damali Richards who is a spoken word artist but is also the Neteru, a human who is born once every thousand years to fight the Dark Realms.  Her most dangerous and most constant enemy from The Dark Realms are vampires.

The entire series is based on the never ending struggle between good and evil. The Vampire Huntress Legend Series is also about the strong bonds of love. Love that exists in the form of family love, friendship love, love of self, love for the world (environment) and the love between man and woman. There is also intense subject matter on religion within this series. The cover art for this series was done by Vince Natale, while some first editions contain inside illustrations by Eric Battle.

Originally a single book, written by Banks after her publisher reached out, the first book was a "750 page tome". Her editor, her agent and Banks herself decided to take a stance and cut the book in half. She got a call from her editor who asked if she wanted to make the series a trilogy so she decided to use the "We didn't see Carlos die" loophole to extend the story. The demand was high and they decided to do four books and call it a series. Banks said she threw "everything but the kitchen sink in there." But her editor told her not to kill Carlos because people loved him. Eventually it became a six book contract, then nine and finally ending it at twelve because she didn't have any more story left.

Minion
The first book in the series, Minion, introduces Damali - a young twenty-year-old African American woman who is Neteru (the huntress). Damali is a very influential spoken word artist who writes and produces all her material (a lot of which is based on her own life experiences). Damali was orphaned at an early age and her experiences in foster care led her to escape, starting her journey as a vampire huntress. Damali's guardian team is introduced, consisting of Marlene, Nafes Shabazz, Big Mike, Jose, JL and Rider. Every member of the group possesses some sort of paranormal abilities.

Damali's team encounter an unusual breed of vampires, who differ from the "regular" ones in appearance and exude an odor so strong that it makes some of the team members physically sick. The protagonists eventually find out that these creatures are hybrids created by the evil vampire Fallon Nuit, who refers to them as "minions".

Carlos Rivera is a young Hispanic drug lord seeking vengeance for his murdered friends and family, unaware that he is being led into a trap by none other than Fallon Nuit who sees plenty of potential evil and wants him to join his cause as a vampire.

In order to save himself, Damali and the guardian team, Carlos forms an alliance with second highest council of the dark side.

The Awakening (2)
Synoposis: Carlos Rivera is on the hunt for the Neteru, and is stronger than Damali's
Guardians ever imagined. Prayer lines notwithstanding, he's coming for his woman.
This thing between them goes way back; it was there even before he'd turned. As a
vampire and a man, he has a lot of decisions to make, a lot of factions after him, but
there's one thing that's always been clear—he wants her.

The Hunted (3)
Synopsis: Carlos Rivera has descended another level, drawing more power from the
dark side. The battle in Hell was nothing compared to the ongoing battle he's fought
against his desire for The Neteru. And this fantastically frustrating woman is going
after the were-demon realms, too? Not on his watch. He's more than a Master
Vampire, he's Council Level now... and still, for all his power, there's one objective
that has consistently eluded him—Damali Richards. But not tonight.

The Bitten (4)
Synopsis: Yeah... she knew what they’d said about not messing with this man, this
temptation... but some things had to be learned by experience. For Damali, this
brother was the one thing that had always slayed her, Isis blade notwithstanding.
She'd gone to his lair to get turned out, not turned... which was a totally different
thing altogether. Only problem is, there is nothing in Marlene's big black book
about how to cure this.
An Encounter of the Forbidden Kind

The Forbidden (5)
The Body of a Goddess...with the Heart of Hell itself.
The devil is a dead-beat dad and his consort Lilith couldn't care less. A stolen embryo stirs in Lilith's womb and a plan pulses through her veins: To unleash her child from the gates of hell—as soon as she destroys the only two vampire hunters who can possibly stop her...

Damali Richards is a woman-child in a world running with blood, depravity and demons. Turned by her lover, Carlos Rivera, and brought back again, Damali clings to the one measure of purity that was handed down to her through generations of the wise, gifted and strong. Now, through the power of magic, through the ache of desire and the touch of her lover, Damali is on a journey from the streets of Philadelphia to the ancient earth of Africa. With a small army, with Carlos and with her own mad skills, she might just save the world from the demon seductress who wants her and her faith obliterated—before Armageddon begins...

Complete series

The Vampire Huntress Legend Series (12 Book Series)
 Minion (trade paperback) (Book 1) (2003)
 Minion: Special Huntress Edition (mass market) (2004)
 The Awakening (trade paperback) (Book 2) (2004)
 The Awakening (mass market) (2004)
 The Hunted (trade paperback) (Book 3) (2004)
 The Hunted (mass market) (2005)
 The Bitten (trade paperback) (Book 4) (2005)
 The Bitten (mass market) (2005)
 The Forbidden (trade paperback) (Book 5) (2005)
 The Forbidden (mass market) (2006)
 The Damned (trade paperback) (Book 6) (2006)
 The Damned (mass market) (January 2007)
 The Forsaken (trade paperback) (Book 7) (2006)
 The Forsaken (mass market) (June 2007)
 The Wicked (trade paperback) (Book 8) (February 2007)
 The Wicked (mass market)  (Book 8)  (January 2008)
 The Cursed   (trade paperback)  (Book 9) (July 2007)
 The Cursed (mass market) (Book 9) (June 2008)
 The Darkness (trade paperback)  (Book 10) (February 2008)
 The Darkness  (mass market) (Book 10)
 The Shadows (trade paperback)  (Book 11) (July 2008)
 The Shadows (mass market)  (Book 11)
 The Thirteenth (trade paperback)  (Book 12) (February 2009)
 The Thirteenth (mass market)  (Book 12)

NOTE: The Darkness (10), The Shadows (11), and The Thirteenth (12) are called The Armageddon Finale to The Vampire Huntress (trademark) Legend Series.

NOTE II: First print, first edition copies of The Damned came with a limited posted illustrated by Eric Battle.

Anthologies
 “Make It Last Forever” In Stroke Of Midnight (2004)
(Rider and Tara's Story)
 “Ride the Night Wind” In Love at First Bite (2006)
(Jose Ciponte and Juanita DeJesus' Story)

Other media

Official Website Content
The official website contained an additional 
 Thirty between the books chapters
 Four Damali's Journal chapters
 Six Inside the Mind of a Vampire chapters
 Two Carlos' Black Box chapters

Additional between the books chapters can be found in:
 Mass Market paperback copies of The Forsaken. - That First Kiss
 Some first edition copies of The Cursed - Between Man and Wife
 The Vampire Huntress Legend Series Sampler - Nothing Like the First Time (Prequel)
 It was given away at large bookselling chains around the release of The Damned. In a December 2006 blog post, L.A. Banks referred to the VHLS sampler as a "little red sampler that came out last December", bringing its original release date into question as most sources list the release date as January 1, 2006.
 Atlantis Rising PDF - Released alongside The Thirteenth on the Publishers Website.
 This chapter was written as a sort of parting between the books chapter by L.A. Banks as the series was ending. It takes place mid-chapter nine.
 Download available on the Internet Archive: Atlantis Rising

Films
The first two books were optioned by Gotham Beach Entertainment and Griot Entertainment.

Jan Harrison of Moontide Pictures LLC ultimately ended up with the movie rights, going as far as writing a script for the movie and assuring fans that they'd be happy with the script.

Comics

Dynamite Entertainment is released a four part limited series which continues the Vampire Huntress stories during the post-armageddon. A four part graphic novel containing all four partas as well as concept sketches and an interview with the author where she implied that she was intending to make more comics.

 L.A. Banls' Vampire Huntress: Dawn and Darkness Book One: Ashes to Ashes
 L.A. Banls' Vampire Huntress: Dawn and Darkness Book One: Ashes to Ashes (Virgin art cover)
 L.A. Banls' Vampire Huntress: Dawn and Darkness Book One: Ashes to Ashes (Negative art cover - limited to 125 copies)
 L.A. Banls' Vampire Huntress: Dawn and Darkness Book Two: Dust to Dust
 L.A. Banls' Vampire Huntress: Dawn and Darkness Book Three: Bygones to Blood
 L.A. Banls' Vampire Huntress: Dawn and Darkness Book Four: Ride or Die
 L.A. Banks' Vampire Huntress: Dawn and Darkness Volume One (Four part graphic novel)

Young Adult Series
Shadow Walker: A Neteru Academy Novel
Sixteen years prior to the end of days, two Neteru's, along with a Neteru Guardian team, known as The Warriors of Light, fought shoulder to shoulder with Guardian teams around the world. Although they vanquished the Ultimate Evil it still came back with insidious vengeance, taking over all the war-ravaged countries slowly but surely. Those who fought against it were hunted, but those brave men and women of the resistance kept the faith and honed their skills, always at the ready to save humanity from demonic forces.

Children of these brave warriors will one day take their parents places in the ongoing struggle. But until that time, they must become adept at using the special talents they were born with and must be kept out of harm's way while their parents continue to fight for justice.

Hence the Neteru Academy (a.k.a. Temt Tchaas Academy - meaning sacred texts) was born. Secreted away in the Appalachian Mountains, this magic-glamoured pyramid that was relocated from the Mayan ruins as well as the capstone taken from Egypt during the big war, hides the entrance to a forgotten bunker left over from the old 1950s cold war between the United States and Russia. Originally built by President Dwight Eisenhower, the actual school is underground and is housed in what was to then be a fall-out shelter for the executive branches of the American government in the event of a nuclear catastrophe. But it never came to that.

The big war everyone feared was not between rival nations, but rival worlds. The conflict between the Light and the darkness unleashed plagues, and vampires, werewolves, zombies, and all manner of demons. It created refugees amongst both the human and supernatural populations. Some individuals were given a chance to choose sides based upon their service to humankind. Others were already too far gone. Some angels wept; some turned dark. It was a time of complete chaos and anarchy was the order of the day.

Initially, only the Guardians and the Neteru's saw what was happening and became the small, rag-tag line of defense against a growing, slithering evil. These brave warriors frustrated the dark side at every turn and still battle on in the new millennium.

Now, with time being short until the Ultimate Evil returns, the children of the Guardian resistance must quickly hone all their special talents and learn expert battle skills - skills that their parents had years to perfect. Time is not on their side, but one can only hope that the Light will make the critical difference.

Other
 Secret Desires
 A a 347 page, special collector's edition of short vignettes that gathers together all the Between the Books episodes in The Vampire Huntress Legends series, between book 5, The Forbidden, and before book 6, The Damned. Published via Cafepress in December 2005.
 Exotic Contraband: LA Banks' Vampire Huntress Legend Concept Art Book
 Sold by The Devil's Candy Store at Comic Con 2008 (July 23–27. Only 250 signed, limited edition art books were made. Featuring art from more than 12 artists. Banks authorised the leftover copies to be sold on the Devil's Candy Store website.

References

External links
  (Archived)
 Official website alternate link (Archived)
 Leslie Esdaile Banks Fan Club (Defunct)
 L.A. Banks Amazon Blog (Archived)
 L.A. Banks personal blog (Archived)
 L.A. Banks personal website (Archived)

Fantasy novel series
American horror novels
American vampire novels
American novel series